The Salem Church, at 208 Ohio Street in Tulare, South Dakota, is a historic church.  It was built in 1911 and was added to the National Register in 1997.

It is Late Gothic Revival in style.

It has a tall centered bell tower with a steeple above the main entrance. It was deemed "a good example of a first generation church in rural South Dakota, constructed in the vernacular Gothic Revival tradition."

References

Churches on the National Register of Historic Places in South Dakota
Gothic Revival church buildings in South Dakota
Churches completed in 1911
Buildings and structures in Spink County, South Dakota
National Register of Historic Places in Spink County, South Dakota